Jyldyz Joldosheva (March 2, 1960, Kyrgyz-Chek, Kara-Suu District, Osh Region, Kyrgyzstan) is a Kyrgyz politician who is a member of the Ata-Jurt Party. She is a member of the Supreme Council of Kyrgyzstan.

References

Members of the Supreme Council (Kyrgyzstan)
21st-century Kyrgyzstani women politicians
21st-century Kyrgyzstani politicians
Living people
People from Osh Region
Year of birth missing (living people)